Rothbury Community Hospital in Rothbury, Northumberland, England, is managed by the Northumbria Healthcare NHS Foundation Trust.

History

Prior to Joining NHS (1872 - 1948) 
The original facility was built as a private home known as Coquet House in 1872. It was converted into the Coquetdale Cottage Hospital in 1905. A maternity ward was added, as a lasting memorial to soldiers who died in the Second World War, in 1946.

Joinng the NHS and Expansion (1948 - 2007) 
It joined the National Health Service in 1948 and the adjoining Hawthorn Cottage was acquired in 1956. After Hawthorn Cottage had been converted into a physiotherapy department, it was officially reopened by Jimmy Savile in 1990.

New Location (2007 - present) 

After the old hospital became dilapidated, modern facilities were built in Whitton Bank Road and opened in 2007, by local GP, Dr. Angus Armstrong, and his son, TV presenter, Alexander Armstrong. The new hospital closed to inpatients in September 2016 and in June 2019 the trust advised that a group was working on proposals for the future of remaining services at the hospital.  The closure caused controversy  and a local protest was established called Save Rothbury Cottage Hospital. Rothbury's Member of Parliament, Anne-Marie Trevelyan (Conservative) condemned the closure to inpatients in the House of Commons on 9 March 2017.

References

External links
Official site

Hospitals established in 1905
1905 establishments in England
Hospitals in Northumberland
Rothbury
NHS hospitals in England